Jack McNaughton (22 December 190522 February 1990) was a British stage and film actor. As a character actor he mostly played supporting roles, but occasionally featured in major roles such as playing the male lead in the 1951 comedy Cheer the Brave.

He was married to the Canadian-born actress Kay Callard.

Selected filmography

 They Made Me a Fugitive (1947) - Soapy
 Brighton Rock (1948) - Trudy brother - pierrot (uncredited)
 London Belongs to Me (1948) - Jimmy
 The Guinea Pig (1948) - (uncredited)
 Brass Monkey (1948) - Porter
 Badger's Green (1949) - Mr. Twigg
 Cardboard Cavalier (1949) - Uriah Group
 Man on the Run (1949) - First Man at Soho Pub
 Madness of the Heart (1949) - Attendant
 No Place for Jennifer (1950) - Coffee Stall Attendant
 Her Favourite Husband (1950) - El Greco
 She Shall Have Murder (1950) - Barman
 The Man in the White Suit (1951) - Taxi Driver
 Cheer the Brave (1951) - Bill Potter
 Green Grow the Rushes (1951) - Bailiff Sgt. Edgar Rigby
 High Treason (1951) - Benson - Scotland Yard Man (uncredited)
 Young Wives' Tale (1951) - Cab driver
 Secret People (1952) - Postman
 No Haunt for a Gentleman (1952) - Fitz-Cholmondley
 The Hour of 13 (1952) - Ford
 Trent's Last Case (1952) - Martin
 The Pickwick Papers (1952) - Mr. Nupkins
 Time Bomb (1953) - Briggs (uncredited)
 Rough Shoot (1953) - Inspector Matthews
 The Million Pound Note (1954) - Williams (uncredited)
 River Beat (1954) - Hickson
 Father Brown (1954) - Railway Guard
 The Purple Plain (1954) - Sgt. Ralph Brown (uncredited)
 The Men of Sherwood Forest (1954) - Outlaw
 Children Galore (1955) - Pat Ark
 The Dam Busters (1955) - Waiter (uncredited)
 Postmark for Danger (1955)
 Dial 999 (1955) - Plainclothes Officer (uncredited)
 Lost (1956) - Hotel Porter (uncredited)
 Private's Progress (1956) - Medical Orderly (uncredited)
 The Long Arm (1956) - Newspaper Circulation Manager (Manchester) (uncredited)
 Town on Trial (1957) - Police Station Sergeant (uncredited)
 After the Ball (1957)
 Lady of Vengeance (1957) - Coroner
 The Camp on Blood Island (1958) - First Prisoner
 Up the Creek (1958) - Regulating Petty Officer
 Tread Softly Stranger (1958) - Workman
 The Rough and the Smooth (1959) - Bartender (uncredited)
 Expresso Bongo (1959) - Jack - Journalist (uncredited)
 The Stranglers of Bombay (1959) - Corp. Roberts (uncredited)
 The Flesh and the Fiends (1960) - Stallholder (uncredited)
 The Court Martial of Major Keller (1961) - Miller

References

Bibliography
 Michael F. Keaney. British Film Noir Guide. McFarland, 2008.

External links

1905 births
1990 deaths
British male film actors
British male stage actors
People from Mitcham